Leptophobia helena, the Helena white, is a butterfly in the family Pieridae. The species was first described by Hippolyte Lucas in 1852. It is found in Colombia, Bolivia, Peru and Ecuador.

Subspecies
The following subspecies are recognised:
Leptophobia helena helena (Ecuador)
Leptophobia helena smithii (Kirby, 1881) (Bolivia, Peru, Ecuador)
Leptophobia helena doubledayi Röber, 1908 (Bolivia)
Leptophobia helena hughesi Lamas, 2003 (Peru)

References

Pierini
Butterflies described in 1852
Pieridae of South America